Gandhi Mandela Awards is a highly prestigious International award, for promoting Gandhian and Nelson Mandela’s values, community service and social development (in Asia & African countries), selected by the top constitutional jury members Justice  K. G. Balakrishnan (Former Chief Justice of India and Former Chairman NHRC India), Justice Dipak Misra (Former Chief Justice of India), Justice Kedar Nath Upadhyay (Former Chief Justice of Nepal & former Chairman NHRC Nepal), Justice M D Tafazzul Islam (Former Chief Justice of Nepal), Justice Gyan Sudha Misra (Former Justice supreme court of India) Established in 2019, by "The Gandhi Mandela Foundation". 

The award is given annually, and the nominations are invited from the Head of the States that includes President, Vice president, Prime Minister of Asian & African Countries or a leading International figure.

The Mahatma Gandhi and Nelson Mandela were the 20th century’s exemplary anti-racism and anti-colonialism leader. Both are known as father figures in their respective nations, both helped shaped their democracies. The Gandhi Mandela Award for Excellence Commemorates the Legacy of the two great men.

The Jury
Justice K. G. Balakrishnan ( Former Chief Justice of India and Former Chairman NHRC India).
Justice Dipak Misra (Former Chief Justice of India)
Justice Kedar Nath Upadhyay (Former Chief Justice of Nepal & former Chairman NHRC Nepal)
Justice M D Tafazzul Islam (Former Chief Justice of Nepal)
Justice Gyan Sudha Misra (Former justice Supreme Court of India)

Nominations in the 1st Edition
Prime Minister of Nepal Mr. Khadga Prasad Sharma Oli
First President & Father of Zambia Mr. Kenneth DB Kaunda 
First President and Father of Bangladesh Late Sheikh Mujibur Rahman 
First President and Father of Sri Lanka Late Don Stephen Senanayake
Former Deputy Prime Minister of India Lal Krishna Advani
Government of United Arab Emirates 
The first lady of The Republic of Burundi Denise Bucumi Nkurunziza
President of Democratic Republic of Congo Mr. Felix Tshisekedi
Prime Minister of Togo Mr. Komi Selom Klassou
Ambassador of Republic of Congo Mr. Andre Poh
In september 2022 His Holiness Dalai Lama Tenzin Gyatso, was presented with the Gandhi Mandela 
Award for his outstanding contribution to world peace and harmony.
In December 2022 in Mexico city the scultor SEBASTIAN was named Cultural Ambassador for the
foundation in the hands of Shri Gino Demeneghi, president for Mexico

References

Indian awards
Gandhism
Peace awards